Pollution is an environmental issue in New Zealand with a number of measures being taken to reduce its severity. New Zealand is sometimes viewed as being "clean and green" but this can be refuted due to pollution levels, among other factors. New Zealand does have a relatively low air pollution level, but some areas have high levels of plastic pollution.

Types

Water pollution

Water pollution in New Zealand varies depending on the level of development in the water catchment areas. In recent years concerns have been raised about the effect of intensification of dairy farming on water quality. The Drying and Clean Streams Accord was established to address problems with water pollution due to dairy farming.

Marine pollution

Fertiliser runs off farms and yards into nearby rivers and streams, which carry it out to the ocean. It is also carried by the cloud and when it rains it drops in the ocean, which is carried by the current.

Air pollution
Smog was a problem in Christchurch.

New Zealand has a relatively unique greenhouse gas emissions profile. In 2007, agriculture contributed 48.2% of total emissions, energy (including transport); 43.2%, industry; 6.1%, waste; 2.4%. In other Kyoto Protocol Annex 1 countries, agriculture typically contributes about 11% of total emissions. From 1990 to 2007, total greenhouse gas emissions in New Zealand increased by 22.1%. Emission increases by sector were - agriculture; 12.1%, energy; 39.2%, industry; 35.0%. Only the small waste sector reduced emissions, by 25.3%.

Legislation
Clean Air Act 1972
Resource Management Act 1991

Notable occurrences
Contaminated site at Mapua
Tui mine tailings dam

See also
Environment of New Zealand
Pesticides in New Zealand
Litter in New Zealand

References

External links
Hazardous substances page at the Ministry for the Environment